Hippocampus debelius, commonly known as the softcoral seahorse, is a species of marine fish of the family Syngnathidae. Individuals were found associated with soft corals. Although little is known of this species, it is expected to feed on crustaceans, similar to other seahorses. It is also expected to be ovoviviparous, with males carrying eggs in a brood pouch before giving birth to live young.

Identification
They have a medium snout with a bulbous tip, a low, angular coronet, and long slender spines on the head, trunk and tail. Spines have dark brown or black tips.

Naming
The specific name honors the Frankfurt am Main born German naturalist Helmut Debelius who is the author of several books on marine life, although he started his working life as a policeman.

References

Further reading
WoRMS
iSeahorse
IUCN Seahorse, Pipefish & Stickleback Specialist Group

debelius
Fish described in 2009